Elvis Presley has inspired artistic and cultural works since he entered the national consciousness. From that point, interest in his personal and public life has never stopped. Some scholars have studied many aspects of his profound cultural influence. Billboard historian Joel Whitburn declared Presley the "#1 act of the Rock era".

The following lists cover various media which include items of historic interest, enduring works of high art, and recent representations in popular culture. Only people and works with Wikipedia articles are included.

For purposes of classification, popular culture music is a separate section from operas and oratorios. Television covers live action series, TV movies, miniseries, and North American animation but not Japanese anime, which appears with manga and graphic novels.

Portrayals 

Actors' last names in alphabetical order

Advertising and branding 
Elvis & Kresse, a company owned by Kresse Wesling and James (nicknamed Elvis at university) Henrit whose upcycling of industrial waste, mostly turning old fire hoses into new luxury products including bags and other carry-on accessories yield profits half of which are donated to various charities.

In 2018, the discount store Poundland changed the voice of its self-service checkouts to that of Elvis in all of its stores throughout the United Kingdom.

Other examples include Audi's 2001 Wackel-Elvis campaign, and State Farm's 2015 "Magic Jingle Elvis" commercial, directed by Roman Coppola

Art
Elvis-related artwork, or those based on known earlier works focusing on Elvis.

Andy Warhol

Andy Warhol's "Portrait of Jean-Michel as David" (1986) is a silver-screen of artist Jean-Michel Basquiat which revisits Warhol's seminal 1963 painting "Double Elvis." It was sold at Sotheby's in New York City on 14 May 2014 for US$3,189,000.

Known silkscreens by American artist Andy Warhol featuring the image(s) of Elvis Presley and their current location, including art museums worldwide, as well as prices met and identified buyers and/or sellers. Prices paid (at either auctions houses or privately) for ten of the silkscreens below, as of end of April 2020 total US$344,000,000.

Cartoons 
Cartoon illustrations of Elvis include:

Bloom County, by Berkeley Breathed, in which Elvis is a character in the comic strip.
Dark Future by Kim Newman, in which Elvis is a major character.
Doonesbury by Garry Trudeau, in which a 1988 storyline featured Presley being found alive on Donald Trump's yacht.
 "Happy Times," a two-part series in Richie Rich/Jackie Jokers.
Elvis at the Gates of Heaven, a filmed cartoon by Stan Lee.
Bubba Ho-Tep x Army of Darkness I and II, a comic book series by Scott Duvall with art by Vincenzo Federici.
Agent King, an adult animated fictional series about the artist leading a double life as a spy and a singer (to be released by Netflix, 2020).

Academia 

 University of Iowa's "American Popular Arts, Elvis as Anthology", 1992 3-credit course,   Iowa City, IA, USA
 Norwalk Community College's Elvis Presley and the American Dream, 1995 3-credit course, Norwalk, CT, USA
 University of Mississippi's International Six-day Conference on Elvis Presley, August 1995, Oxford, MS, USA
 Open University's Master of Arts in popular culture: Elvis Presley", 2005, Milton Keynes, UK
 Lakehead University's lectures on  "Looking for Elvis", June 2009, Orillia, Ontario, Canada
 Arizona State University' Elvis- MUSIC 354, Summer of 2015, 3-credit course, Phoenix, AZ, USA
 University of Oviedo's "Elvis, a synthesis of an América in B&W" 2016, Oviedo, Gijón y Avilés campuses, Spain. 
 University of Kent's Elvis Presley Seminar, June 3, 2017, Canterbury, UK
 Stonehill College's 2018 periodical Seminar on the death of Elvis Presley, Easton, MA
 University of Adelaide's MUSGEN 2001 - 2018 From Elvis to YouTube Seminar,  Adelaide, Australia
 York University's "All thing Elvis"  June 10, 2019 lecture, Toronto, Canada

Events
The Memphis Summer Storm of 2003 was nicknamed "Hurricane Elvis"

Festivals 
Michigan ElvisFest, first held in 1989, then annually, in Riverside Park and Depot Town in Ypsilanti, Michigan
Parkes Elvis Festival, first held in 1993, then annually since 2005 in Parkes, New South Wales, Australia
Collingwood Elvis Festival, first held in 1995, then annually in Collingwood, Ontario, Canada
Tupelo Elvis Festival, first held in 1998, yearly since. Tupelo, MS
Mesquite, Nevada 's Elvis Rocks Mesquite competition, annually since 2009. Mesquite, NV, USA
Penticton Elvis Festival, first in 2002, annually since 2010, Okanagan Valley, British Columbia, Canada
Kobe Elvis Festival, annually since 2010 in Kobe, Japan
Brunswick Elvis Festival, first held in 2011, then annually in Brunswick, Georgia, USA
 Niagara Falls Elvis Festival, first in 2017, then annually in Niagara Falls, New York, USA
Nashville Elvis Festival, first held in 2017, then annually in Nashville, Tennessee, USA
 "Starring Louisiana", Krewe of Bacchus Parade, 2019, "King Creole" float, New Orleans, Louisiana, USA

Film

According to John Beyfuss, who reviews films for Memphis' Commercial Appeal since 1998, there has been since then an average of eighteen movies per year which carry some allusion to Elvis. There were an additional one hundred before 1998, which puts the number of such Elvis referencing in motion pictures, from numerous countries, at a minimum of four hundred since 1957, when the first such mention was made as part of the BBC-TV movie documentary A Night in the City. The list below is only a partial account and will be updated accordingly.

 A Brighter Summer Day: Sir and his friends send tapes to Elvis; film's title is from "Are You Lonesome Tonight?"
 Bubba Ho-Tep
 Bye Bye Birdie: hysteria ensues when an Elvis-like singer is drafted into the US Army
 Cry-Baby
 God Is the Bigger Elvis, Oscar-nominated documentary about the life of Dolores Hart
 Elmo in Grouchland: Huxley points to a Velvet Elvis as one of his possessions
 Elvis & Nixon
 Elvis and the Beauty Queen
 Elvis Meets Nixon
 Elvis Has Left the Building
 Finding Graceland
 The Gift
 Happy Feet: The character Memphis is based on Presley's personality and vocals, and he is named after Presley's famous hometown Memphis, Tennessee. Hugh Jackman, who provides the speaking and singing voice of the character, did his own Elvis impersonation for the film's soundtrack.
 Heartbreak Hotel: Elvis is kidnapped by a fan's son
 Honeymoon in Vegas: Jack is aided by a band of Elvis impersonators
 Hounddog: Lou gives Lewellen some Elvis records
 Idol on Parade about a British rock and roll star being drafted to the English Army.
 Independence Day: upon escaping the Mother Ship, Hiller declares "Elvis has left the building!" to which Levinson imitates Elvis saying, "Thank you, thank you very much."
 Looney Tunes: Back in Action: the song "Viva Las Vegas" plays upon arrival in Las Vegas.
 Lilo & Stitch franchise: Presley's songs and images are featured throughout, with title character Lilo Pelekai portrayed as a huge fan of Presley. Stitch also regularly impersonates Elvis in the TV series of the same name and makes a few references to Presley in some Disney crossover video games.
 Lilo & Stitch: Lilo uses Presley as a role model for Stitch to follow in an attempt to tame him. During a sequence, Stitch plays ukulele to the guitar solo of "(You're the) Devil in Disguise" twice, the second time while impersonating Elvis. In a photo shown at the beginning of the closing credits, Lilo, Stitch, Nani, and David pose before Graceland.
 Stitch! The Movie: "Slicin' Sand" is used as the film's opening song.
 Lilo & Stitch 2: Stitch Has a Glitch: Lilo looks to Elvis for inspiration to come up with an idea for her hula dance; she and Stitch go to several spots around Kauai where Presley supposedly visited, including a bench he supposedly sat on in Blue Hawaii.
 Leroy & Stitch: Lilo gives Jumba an Elvis record as a parting gift; he uses Presley's cover of "Aloha ʻOe" on said record to program a fail-safe in Leroy that shuts him down upon hearing it.
 Man on the Moon: Jim Carrey's take on Andy Kaufman's Elvis impersonation.
 Men in Black: In the car, Agent K sings along to a cassette tape of Elvis' version of the song 'Promised Land'. When Agent J sarcastically asks if he knows that Elvis is dead K responds, "No, Elvis is not dead, he just went home", implying Elvis was in fact an alien visiting Earth. 
 Mystery Train: Elvis's ghost appears in a dream to Luisa; every room in the hotel has an Elvis portrait
 Oblivion: Jack has an Elvis bobble-head doll
 The Outsiders: the Greasers emulate Elvis
 Phir Bhi Dil Hai Hindustani: In the song "I Am The Best", Shah Rukh Khan dresses up as Elvis and does his iconic hip movement.
 Pulp Fiction: an Elvis impersonator performs at Jackrabbit Slim's
 RoboCop 2: Elvis's skeletal remains with a picture of Elvis near it is seen by RoboCop at the sludge plant where the villain Cain and his Nuke Cult are hiding out. 
  Rock-A-Doodle. The main character of Chanticleer resembles Elvis Presley, and is also referred to as The King. 
 Scary Prairie, animated short by Erik Winkowski depicting Elvis attempting to save Marilyn Monroe from a string of Japanese monsters.
 This is Spinal Tap: the band visits Graceland
 3000 Miles to Graceland: a group plans a robbery in Las Vegas dressed as Elvis impersonators
 Touched by Love, also known as To Elvis, with Love
 Top Secret!: Nick performs "Are You Lonesome Tonight?"; film parodies Elvis's musicals
 Tropico: Elvis is shown in the Garden of Eden alongside Adam, Eve, Jesus, the Virgin Mary, John Wayne and Marilyn Monroe
 True Romance: Elvis's ghost mentors Clarence
 Wild at Heart: Sailor and Powermad perform "Love Me"
 Wired: John Belushi impersonates Elvis

Internet 
In the shared alternate history of Ill Bethisad (1997 and after), an analogue of Presley called "Elvis Pressler" appears. Just like the real-life Presley, his alternate universe counterpart Pressler was a famous Rock singer who was also an actor though there are also several notable differences between the two. First, Presley's identical twin brother, Jesse was stillborn, but Pressler's twin brother (also called Jesse) was born alive. Next, Pressler withdrew from public life in 1973 after he divorced his wife, Drusilla. While the real Elvis Presley was addicted to prescription drugs and had poor health during the mid-1970s, those were only rumors in the case of Pressler who spent most of 1973 to 1976 in his mansion helping doctors treat his twin Jesse for depression and alcoholism. Unlike Presley whose comeback happened in 1968 with a TV special, Pressler's comeback occurred in 1976 with the release of a new album Hope. Finally, both die on the same day (August 16, 1977) but Pressler dies in a more dignified manner (resembling how John Denver died in reality, though Denver, called both "Jean de Cournouaille" and "John Cornwall" and isn't an analogue, doesn't die that way in Ill Bethisad but is still alive and performing as of the mid-2000s) compared to the real-life Presley. Pressler, a few hours before a planned concert in Thunder Bay decides to fly on his personal autogyro (a much more common aircraft in Ill Bethisad then in reality) which he often did to relax, but while flying, the autogyro crashes and Pressler is killed. Neither his body or the craft were found until 1981. In the meantime, rumors and conspiracy theories circulated purporting to explain what really happened to Pressler.

Literature 
Ace Tucker Space Trucker by James R. Tramontana
Almost Famous (story by Cameron Crowe written in 1996, but only published in 2019)
The Armageddon trilogy by Robert Rankin
Biggest Elvis by P. F. Kluge
Elvissey by Jack Womack (1993)
Hitchhikers Guide to the Galaxy: Mostly Harmless
The Kane Chronicles: Carter has to rob Elvis's tomb to obtain an important clue
Letters from Elvis, by Gary Lindberg
Love me tender by Roy Paul Shields
King Clone by Ted Harrison
Nightmares & Dreamscapes: "You Know They Got a Hell of a Band"
 The Odd Thomas series by Dean Koontz
 Raised on Rock, by Thomas Drago
 Refried Elvis, Erik Zolov
 Rey Criollo, Parmenides Garcia Saldaña 
Southern Vampire Mysteries by Charlaine Harris
Truth like the sun by Jim Lynch, 2012.
Big bang by David Bowman, 2019 (posthumous)

Science and technology 

Elvis (text editor)
Elvis operator, a type of conditional operator in programming
Elvis, a code name for the Nokia Lumia 1020
17059 Elvis, an asteroid
Elvis (helicopter)

Popular culture 
"Elvis has left the building"
Memphis Mafia
Elvis sightings
Elvis impersonator
Elvis Herselvis

Musicals, plays  and stage productions 

Are You Lonesome Tonight?
All Shook Up
 All the King's women by Luigi Jannuzzi
 Aye, Elvis by Morna Young, Directed By Ken Alexander
Beach Blanket Babylon
Bye Bye Birdie: hysteria ensues when an Elvis-like singer is drafted into the Army
 Coming back like a song, a play about stopping Elvis' reign in 1956 by Lee Kalcheim
 Confetti from Graceland
Cooking with Elvis
 One degree from Elvis by Katie McGrath
The Elvis Dead: a comic retelling of horror film Evil Dead II in the style of Elvis.
 Elvis, My Way by Brandon Bennet at the Gretna Theatre, Philadelphia, PA Elvis sings "Old Shep", by Anne McKee Elvis the Musical" by   Quin Gresham,  Four Weddings and an Elvis by Nancy Frick.Graceland by Ellen Byron, directed by Tommy WootenGrease: Main character's Elvis idiosincracies a main theme of the play.Happy Days Heartbreak Hotel by Floyd Mutrux Jailhouse Rock the London  Musical   by Rob Bettinson, Joseph and the Amazing Technicolor Dreamcoat: Pharaoh is acted in the style of PresleyMillion Dollar Quartet by Floyd MutruxNunsense II: Sister Mary Hubert impersonates ElvisPicasso at the Lapin Agile, Elvis one of three main charactersSmokey Joe's Cafe: features the Elvis songs "Trouble" and "Treat Me Nice" Spaghetti from Graceland When Elvis Met Che, play by Sol Biderman
Elvis Radio

Television

 Notable references ALF: "Suspicious Minds", ALF and Willie suspect their new neighbor is ElvisBoy Meets World: "Danger Boy", Elvis eats at Chubbie's and plays poker with AlanCelebrity Deathmatch: "Nick In A Coma", in a morpheme-induced dream, Nick dreams of a fight between Elvis and Jerry GarciaCivil Wars: "Pilot", an Elvis impersonator is served with divorce papersCoach: "Viva Las Ratings", Luther travels to Las Vegas, planning to "invest" his life's savings at an Elvis memorabilia auctionCrossing Jordan: "Miracles & Wonders", Nigel thinks a dead Elvis impersonator may actually be ElvisCSI: Crime Scene Investigation: "Blood Moon", the team encounters an Elvis vampireDC's Legends of Tomorrow: "Amazing Grace", the Legends encounter Elvis after he comes into possession of the Death TotemDesigning Women: 
Charlene is an Elvis fan
"E.P. Phone Home", the ladies travel to Memphis for a tour of Graceland
"Shovel Off to Buffalo", Mary Jo's shovel has Elvis' face impressed on itE Street: "Episode 385", Ernie and Sally are married by an Elvis impersonatorEerie, Indiana: Elvis walks of out his home to get the newspaper in several episodesElvis TV seriesElvis TV mini-seriesFamily Matters: "Ain't Nothing but an Urkel", Steve accidentally transforms into Elvis via his Transformation ChamberFather Ted: "Competition Time"Fireman Sam: Fireman Elvis Cridlington is named after and inspired by Elvis
Full House: Jesse is obsessed with Elvis, and once had a job as an Elvis impersonatorGive My Head Peace: Uncle Andy is an Elvis fan
Hannah Montana: Hannah's brother Jackson is a celebrity impersonator, most notably, Elvis and Ozzy OsbourneHorrible Histories: Tom Stourton plays Elvis Presley in Series 7 The Golden Girls: 
"The President's Coming! The President's Coming! Part 1", the ladies encounter an Elvis impersonator
"Sophia's Wedding: Part 1", Sophia is married before an audience of Elvis impersonatorsThe Killing: "Unraveling", Holder references a Velvet ElvisLas Vegas: theme song is "A Little Less Conversation"The Last Precinct: King is an Elvis impersonatorMarried... with Children: "I'm Going to Sweatland", the Bundys are inundated with fans when a perspiration stain on Al's shirt resembles a silhouette of ElvisMiami Vice: Crockett owns an alligator named Elvis; Switeck is an Elvis fanThe Miraculous Mellops: several episodes features Elvis impersonatorsThe New WKRP in Cincinnati: "Long Live the King", Les's editorial denouncing a rival station's Elvis look-alike contest prompts a call from a man who claims to be ElvisNightmares & Dreamscapes: "You Know They Got a Hell of a Band", Elvis is the Mayor of OregonNip/Tuck: "Joyce & Sharon Monroe", an Elvis impersonator wants to look more like ElvisPizza: "Dangerous Pizza", a group of Elvis impersonators get into a fight with a group of KISS impersonatorsQuantum Leap: "Memphis Melody - July 3, 1954", Sam leaps into ElvisRed Dwarf: "Meltdown", Elvis is part of a group of Heroes (including Pythagoras, Stan Laurel, Albert Einstein and Marilyn Monroe) that Rimmer and Kryten lead against the Villains factionRenegade: "The King and I", Reno thinks a stranger who helped him during a fight may be ElvisSaturday Night Live: 
"Jackie Chan/Kid Rock", played by Karen Lynn Gorney
"Matthew Broderick/The Sugarcubes", played by Kevin Nealon
"John Madden/Jennifer Holliday", played by Andy Kaufman
"Shelley Duvall/Joan Armatrading", played by John Belushi7th Heaven: "The Heart of the Matter", an anesthetized Eric thinks he's ElvisShake, Rattle and Roll: An American Love StoryThe Simpsons:
"Viva Ned Flanders"
"Viva Los Simpsons" 2005 DVD episode collection, Homer apes Elvis on the coverSledge Hammer: "All Shook Up", Hammer goes undercover as an Elvis impersonator to catch an Elvis impersonator killerSliders: "Pilot", Quinn sees a billboard of an elderly Elvis in Las VegasSpitting Image: Elvis parody "I'm Sure Livin' Since I Died"The Twilight Zone: "The Once and Future King"Vinyl: "The King and I", Finestra attempts to lure Elvis away from Colonel Tom Parker, and sign with American CenturyWalker, Texas Ranger: "Suspicious Minds", the daughter of an Elvis impersonator witnesses a murderThe X-Files: "Never Again", Mulder travels to Graceland

Appearances and other programming

Stage Show, 6 episodes in 1956 filmed at CBS Studio 50 in New York City on January 28, February 4, 11, 18, March 17 and 24, for the so-called " Tommy and Jimmy Dorsey's show", a program produced by Jackie Gleason as a lead-in for his show.  Each episode was watched by an estimated audience of 6 million viewers, averaging an 18.4% share. Jazz and pop musician Quincy Jones, then 23 years old and on a somewhat extended three-month visit to his family in New York, played second trumpet on all Presley's performances.Texaco Star Theater, 2 episodes in 1956:

 April 3 aboard the 24 Essex-class aircraft carrier USS Hancock in San Diego, CA.
 June 5 from NBC studios Los Angeles, CA. Audience estimated to have been 18 and 22 million viewers respectively. Segments of the latter were shown in the 1994 blockbuster Forrest Gump.Teenage Dance Party, June 16, 1956; hosted by Wink Martindale, WHBQ-TV Memphis, TNHy Gardner Calling, July 1, 1956 television interview, WRCA-TV, New York City, NYThe Steve Allen Show, July 1, 1956 from the NBC studio at The Hudson Theatre, in New York City. This show was watched by 40 million viewers representing a 20.2 rating and a 55.3% share, the highest in the history of the Steve Allen Show. Also, according to interviewers from Sidlinger & Company, it was the most talked about show in the preceding 52 weeks, with 38 million adults, or 31% of the US population acknowledging having discussed the show in the period from 1 to 7 July, the highest ever since the interviews were first launched.The Ed Sullivan Show. 3 episodes. All three episodes were released in their entirety on DVD format on November 21, 2006, by Image Entertainment, selling 100,000 copies during its first year alone.

 September 9, 1956,  live feed from CBS Television City in Fairfax District, CA, garnering some 60.7 million viewers and a 57.1 rating, both records up to that time. The % share, an 82.6% and also a record, remains the largest ever garnered, by any network or group of networks, for any single program in the history of US television.
 October 28, 1956 from CBS Studio 50, New York City, drawing a 34.6 rating with a 57% share and an estimated audience of 56.5 million and.... 
 January 6, 1957, also from Studio 50, New York City, drawing a 47.4 share and reaching some 54.6 million viewers.The Frank Sinatra Timex Show: Welcome Home Elvis : Taped March 26, 1960 at the Fontainebleau Hotel in Miami Beach, FL; it aired on ABC May 12, 1960. Nielsen reported a 41.5 rating and 67.7% share, with an audience at 50 million, the top-rated show of 1960 and of Frank Sinatra's 21-year television special career (1960–1981). It was released on DVD by Quantum Leap on February 10, 2004	Elvis (also known as the Elvis Comeback Special or the 68 Comeback Special). Taping in June 1968 was at NBC Studios in Burbank, CA; the air date being December 3. 1968.  With a 47.8 share, the telecast garnered the highest ratings of any program in 1968, viewed by an estimated audience of 50 million. Released on VHS in 1986, RIAA Platinum; on DVD format in 2004, RIAA 4× Platinum; as DVD Special Edition in 2006, RIAA 2× Platinum. Presented by Ann-Margret.	Aloha from Hawaii Via Satellite, was a Kui Lee Cancer Fund benefit concert at Honolulu's Neal S. Blaisdell Center, presented by Ann-Margret. It was broadcast by NBC worldwide, live on January 14, 1973, and in the US as a deferred telecast on April 4, 1973.  Ratings for the US telecast were the highest of the week reaching a 33.8 rating, a 57% share, as well as a viewership estimated at 50 million. Global viewership reached about a billion when shown live by INTELSAT on January 14, 1973. It attracted 91.8 percent of viewers in the Philippines, 70-80 percent in both Hong Kong and South Korea,   as well as almost 40% percent in Japan. It was first released on VHS in 1986, earning an RIAA Platinum award; on DVD in 2004, RIAA 4× Platinum; as Special Edition DVD 2006, RIAA Platinum	Elvis in Concert. His last concert tour, filmed 2 months before his death, then broadcast by CBS as a one-hour special after his death and airing on October 3, 1977. This posthumous presentation was the top-rated program of the week, with a 34.1 rating, reaching a little over 24.1 million households and an estimated audience of 50 million viewers.	The Elvis Cover-Up. Special airing in 1979. According to Nielsen, it obtained a 43% share, equivalent to an estimated audience of over 50 million viewers, the 2nd highest audience ever garnered for the "20/20" series, a popular news-magazine program on the ABC network.One Night with You. HBO Special airing on August 15, 1985. Released by Light Year Video Entertainment on VHS on November 24, 1992, and on DVD on August 1, 2000	[19]Elvis and Me. An ABC TV two-part miniseries which aired on the nights of February 7 and 8, 1988. According to Nielsen it was the highest rated TV film of 1987–88 season as seen by 32.4 and 31.4 million viewers, respectively.Elvis: The Tribute. This was an ABC TV Special, originally on pay per view and airing on October 8 of 1994 live from the Pyramid Arena in Memphis. It then aired on ABC in 1995, as hosted by John Stamos and with the then Mr.and Mrs Michael Jackson in the audience.He Touched Me: The Gospel Music of Elvis Presley. Three-hour documentary airing on various channels in 1998 and 1999 and released in DVD by Coming Home Studios in 2000, RIAA Platinum and RIAA 2× Platinum, respectively.Elvis Lives. NBC special made in conjunction with the release of ELV1S: 30 No. 1 Hits and airing on 28 November 2002.	Elvis by the Presleys. CBS special airing May 13, 2005, receiving an 8.1 rating and a 15% share and winning its time slot with an audience of 12 million viewers. Released on DVD in 2005, RIAA 2× Platinum.	Idol Gives Back. The Elvis and Celine Dion segment dueting on "If I can dream" was broadcast by Fox through rotoscoping on April 25, 2007. It drew a 24% share and an audience of 26.4 million viewers while raising US$79 million in donations by year's end. It was also the top show of the week and the top rated "Idol Gives Back" in its 3-year history (2007–2010).Elvis Presley: The Searcher. An HBO Special airing on 14 April 2018, whose parts 1 and 2 reaching close to 900,000 viewers. Released on DVD format by Sony Legacy on April 6, 2018	1968 Special's 50th anniversary (All Star Tribute). Elvis and 19 other performers (Blake Shelton, Shawn Mendes, Keith Urban, Post Malone, John Fogerty, Ed Sheeran, Kelsea Ballerini, Jennifer Lopez, Darius Rucker, Alessia Cara, Mac Davis, John Legend, Little Big Town, Adam Lambert, Pistol Annies, Carrie Underwood, Yolanda Adams, Dierks Bentley, and Josh Groban). Aired February 17.2019. Filmed October 2018 at NBC Studios in Los Angeles, CA. The telecast earned one of the top 5 highest ratings for any program in its time slot (Sunday, 8–10 pm ET, a 3% share with an audience estimated by Nielsen at 6.3 million viewers)

Sports

King Elvis the First, mascot of the Kenosha Kingfish, a baseball team playing at a collegiate summer baseball league in the state of Wisconsin,
Kid Galahad, name taken from an Elvis film by world champion boxer Kid Galahad
Las Vegas Raiders: Giant murals by Michael Godard of Elvis wearing a # 20 football jersey with the name Presley,   and of Marilyn Monroe as a cheerleader recently unveiled inside Las Vegas' new Allegiant Stadium.
Memphis 901 FC: Crown logo dedicated to Elvis and BB King.
New England Patriots: Flying Elvis logo
The Honky Tonk Man: American professional wrestler who wore jumpsuits similar to Elvis's in-ring, while also styled with slicked-back black hair and sideburns. He also carried a guitar to the ring.

Stamps
U.S. Postal Service, US$0.29 stamp. Dedicated on January 8, 1993, the actual image chosen, amongst 60 entries,  being that of a watercolor airbrush and acrylic on board portrait of a young Elvis, as presented by artist Mark Stutzman. Some 517 million were printed and sold, with 124.1 million of them saved, and thus making it the most popular commemorative stamp, as well as the largest earner,  a profit of US$32.5 million,  to have ever been issued by the USPS as noted by the Washington Post.
U.S. Postal Service, US$0.49 Elvis Presley Forever stamp. Dedicated on August 12, 2015, making Elvis Presley, the only US national,  other than Martin Luther King Jr. and several US Presidents, who has been the subject of two commemorative stamps since the USPS's founding in 1971. The image chosen was a 1955 photograph of Elvis by William Speer, with complementary work by designers Antonio Alcalá and Leslie Badani
There are 69 countries and territories, from Albania to Zaire, which have used Presley's image for their commemorative stamps.

Video games
 Bill & Ted's Excellent Video Game Adventure: Elvis is one of sixteen "historical dudes" who can be rescued.
 Civilization I, Civilization II, and  Civilization III: In the city screen the citizens assigned as entertainers depicted as Elvis Presley.
 Civilization II: The "Attitude" Advisor in the player's "High Council", who advises on the peoples' happiness, is an Elvis Presley caricature, wearing sunglasses even in the Ancient period.
 Fallout: New Vegas: one faction is called "The Kings", raiders who come across an Elvis Impersonator School. Although The Kings impersonate Elvis and know his songs, they don't know Presley's real name as none of the Elvis material they found at the school used it (The game is set two centuries after a nuclear war and as a result, knowledge of Elvis was lost until they found the school). They instead call Elvis "The King".
 Fisher-Price Sing-Alongs: Barnyard Rhythm & Moos: A pig dressed as Elvis performs the song "Barn House Rock" as "Elvis Pigsley."
 The Legend of Zelda: Wind Waker: A dancer named Tott with a striking resemblance to Elvis Presley appears on Windfall Island.
 Leisure Suit Larry III: Passionate Patti in Pursuit of the Pulsating Pectorals: Elvis Presley may randomly appear at the bar in Patti's piano lounge.
 Perfect Dark: The Extraterrestrial Maian Diplomat, known as Protector1, adopts the name Elvis as he becomes enamored with terrestrial culture, going as far to own a pair of blue suede shoes during the climax of the game.
 Theme Hospital: In later levels, patients arrive at the hospital suffering from "King Complex". Symptoms included the patient dressing up like Elvis, wearing a white/grey jacket with a red music note at its back, matching trousers, sunglasses and Elvis' famous hairdo. It was cured by visiting a psychologist, who would tell the patient how ridiculous he/she looked.
 Transformice: Elvis' hair appears in the shop.
 Wayne's World: Elvis appears as a level boss.

 Other eponymous uses 

Elvis (comic strip), a Swedish comic strip
Elvis Rock, in Ceredigion, Wales
Debby Ryan's cat (Elvis)

Fictional characters
Elvis Cridlington, a firefighter in Fireman SamElvis "EJ" DiMera, a character on the American soap opera Days of Our Lives
Elvis, a character in Perfect DarkElvis, a character in God HandElvis, a host of The Dog HouseElvis, a fictional alligator in Miami ViceElvis, a guide dog in Growing Up Fisher''

See also
 Cultural impact of Elvis Presley
 Elvis Presley
 Elvis Presley on film and television
 List of halls of fame inducting Elvis Presley

References

External links 
 
 

 
Dynamic lists
American art
American music history
Presley